Madavoor Vasudevan Nair (7 April 1929 alattukavu, vallikeezhu, kollam, (Kerala) – 6 February 2018) was a veteran Kathakali artiste.

He was awarded the Padma Bhushan by the Government of India. He taught the Kaplingadan style of Kathakali performance and was also one of the last practitioners of the south Kerala style (Kaplingadan) school of the classical dance-drama. He died during a stage performance at Agasthyakode Mahadeva Temple in Anchal, Kollam district, on 6 February 2018, aged 88.

References

External links

Kathakali exponents
Artists from Thiruvananthapuram
1929 births
2018 deaths
Recipients of the Padma Bhushan in arts
Dancers from Kerala
Recipients of the Sangeet Natak Akademi Award
Indian male dancers